This list is about incidents of civil unrest, rioting, violent labor disputes, or minor insurrections or revolts in New York City.

By date
Civil unrest in New York by date in ascending order, from earliest to latest.

 1712 – New York Slave Revolt occurred on April 6, when Africans set fire to a building and attacked settlers
 1741 – New York Conspiracy occurred when a series of fires March through April burned portions of the city
 1788 – Doctors Mob Riot, occurred in April over the illegal procurement of corpses from the graves of slaves and poor whites
 1834 – Anti-abolitionist riot, occurred from July 7 to July 10 over abolitionism
 1837 – Flour Riots, occurred February 12, when merchant stores were sacked, destroying or looting 500-600 barrels of flour and 1,000 bushels of wheat
 1844 – Brooklyn riot, occurred on April 4 between nativists and Irish immigrants.
 1849 – Astor Place riot, occurred May 10 at the Astor Opera House between immigrants and nativists
 1857 – New York City Police Riot occurred June 16 between the New York Municipal Police and the Metropolitan Police over the Mayor's appointment for the position of city street commissioner
 1857 – Dead Rabbits Riot, occurred July 4 through 5 and consisted of widespread gang violence and looting
 1863 – New York City draft riots, occurred July 13 through 16 in response to government efforts to draft men to fight in the ongoing American Civil War. 
 1870 – First New York City Orange riot, occurred July 12 when demonstrators clashed with hecklers and laborers during a parade  
 1871 – Second New York City Orange riot, occurred July 12 when Orangemen, police and militia clashed with the crowd during a parade
 1874 – Tompkins Square riot, occurred January 13 when the New York City Police Department clashed with demonstrators
 1900 - New York City Race Riot, occurred August 15 through 17th after the death of a white undercover police officer, Robert J. Thorpe caused by Arthur Harris, a black man.
 1917 – New York City Food Riot, occurred February 20 over shortages related to World War I
 1919 – May Day Riots
 1919 – New York race riots of 1919
 1922 – Straw Hat Riot, occurred September 13 and 14 when gangs of boys stole hats throughout the city and assaulted those who resisted
 1926 – Harlem Riots of July 1926. between unemployed Jews and Puerto Ricans over jobs and housing. This riot started on One Hundred and Fifteenth Street (115th), between Lenox and Park Avenues. Reserves from four Police precincts struggled for nearly half an hour before they dispersed a crowd estimated at more than 2,000 and brought temporary peace to the neighborhood.
 1935 – Harlem riot, occurred March 19–20, sparked by rumors of the beating of a teenage shoplifter
 1943 – Harlem riot, occurred August 1 and 2 following the nonfatal shooting of Robert Bandy by a white police officer

 1964 – Harlem riot, occurred July 16 through 22, following the fatal police shooting of a 15-year-old African American bystander
 1967 - In a wave of race riots across the country called the Long, hot summer of 1967, riots and looting took place in Spanish Harlem and Bedford-Stuyvesant
 1968 – New York City riot, occurred April 4 and 5 following the assassination of Martin Luther King
 1968 – Columbia University protests, occurred April 23 in response to the Vietnam War and segregation
 1969 – Stonewall riots, occurred June 28 through July 2 as a series of spontaneous, violent demonstrations by members of the gay (LGBT) community in response to a police raid of the Stonewall Inn
 1970 – Hard Hat Riot, occurred May 8 in a confrontation between construction workers and protesters of the Vietnam War, the Kent State shootings, and the U.S. invasion of Cambodia
 1973 – Shooting of Clifford Glover, occurred on April 28 and led to several days of rioting in the South Jamaica neighborhood
 1977 – New York City Blackout riot, occurred July 13 and 14, when widespread looting and arson followed a power outage
 1988 – Tompkins Square Park riot, occurred August 6 and 7 as protesters against a city imposed curfew clashed with police
 1991 – Crown Heights riot, occurred August 19 through 21 between black and Orthodox Jewish residents after two children of Guyanese immigrants were unintentionally struck by an automobile driven by an Orthodox Jew
 1992 – Washington Heights riots, occurred July 4 through 7 following the fatal police shooting of Jose Garcia, a 23-year-old immigrant from the Dominican Republic. One man was killed after falling five stories off a building, 15 were injured and 11 were arrested. 
 1992 – Patrolmen's Benevolent Association Riot, occurred September 16. Carried out by thousands of off-duty police officers protesting mayor David N. Dinkins' proposal to create a civilian agency to investigate police misconduct. The 300 uniformed officers did little to stop the protesters from jumping barricades and causing extensive property damage.
 2011 – Occupy Wall Street (Brooklyn Bridge protests). Demonstrators blocked the bridge and more than 700 people were arrested. Brooklyn, New York
 2013 – Flatbush Riots, on March 11, a candlelight vigil was held in response to the police shooting death of 16-year-old Kimani Gray, who allegedly pointed a .38 caliber pistol at the officers, though a later witness disputed Gray held a weapon and neither fingerprints nor DNA recovered from the weapon were a match for Gray. The demonstration turned violent due to disappointment that no public officials had attended. At least one person was injured and a Rite Aid store was looted and damaged. There was one arrest on disorderly conduct. Violence continued on March 12 resulting in two officers receiving minor injuries and 46 arrests, mostly for disorderly conduct.
2020 – George Floyd protests. Protests began after officers in Minnesota murdered George Floyd, an unarmed black man.

By number of deaths
The following is a list of civil unrest in New York by number of deaths in descending order from most to least deaths. In cases where the number of deaths is uncertain, the lowest estimate is used.

 1863 – New York City draft riots, 120 killed and 2,000 to 8,000 injured
 1871 – Second New York City orange riot, more than 60 dead, more than 150 wounded
 1741 – New York Conspiracy, 35 total executed as a result
 1712 – New York Slave Revolt, 31 total deaths consisting of 9 killed in the revolt and 23 executed as a result
 1849 – Astor Place riot, 25 killed and more than 120 injured
 1857 – Dead Rabbits Riot, eight dead and between 30 and 100 injured
 1870 – First New York City orange riot, eight dead
 1788 – Doctors Mob Riot, between six and 20 dead
 1943 – Harlem riot, six dead
 1935 – Harlem riot, three dead
 1992 – Washington Heights riots, six dead and 15 injured
 1991 – Crown Heights riot, two dead and 190 injured
 1964 – Harlem riot, one dead, 118 injured

No deaths
The following is a list of civil unrest in New York where no deaths occurred listed in ascending order by year, from earliest to latest. The number of injured is listed in cases where the number is known.

 1834 – Anti-abolitionist riot
 1837 – Flour Riots
 1844 – Brooklyn riot
 1857 – New York City Police Riot, 53 injured
 1874 – Tompkins Square riot
 1922 – Straw Hat Riot, unknown number injured in assaults, seven of the offending boys "spanked ignominiously" by order of the police lieutenant
 1970 – Hard Hat Riot, more than 70 injured
 1973 – Shooting of Clifford Glover, 24 injured
 1977 – New York City Blackout riot
 1988 – Tompkins Square Park riot, 38 injured
 2020 – George Floyd protests, 353+ injured

See also
 Timeline of New York City
 List of incidents of civil unrest in the United States
 Lists of Incidents of unrest and violence in the United States by city
 List of riots (notable incidents of civil disorder worldwide)

References

History of New York City
Events in New York City
 
Incidents of civil unrest
Incidents of civil unrest in New York City